Kaia Bruland Nilssen (1868 – 18 January 1950) was a Norwegian novelist.

Beginning in 1895, she published several novellas and novels, and occasionally poems. She has been noted as writing non-pretentious trivial literature for a female audience. The book Aagot Vangen - et livsbillede from 1903 is a biographical novel about the Norwegian sculptress Aagot Vangen, who received her artistic education in Paris but died when still in her twenties. Kaia Bruland-Nilssen's most popular book was 1897's Sjøgutten. She also contributed to the scandal sheet Spidskuglen.

She resided near Bekkestua in Bærum. She died in 1950.

Selected works
First editions only:
Violinspilleren, 1895
Stedmoder og steddatter, 1896
Sjøgutten, 1897
Forstand og hjerte, 1898
Tante Ellen: fortælling, 1899
Aagot Vangen: et livsbillede, 1903
Dagmar Norgaards veninde, 1905
Skjærgaardsliv, 1908
Familien Granli, 1910
Gutten som visste at hjelpe sig, 1915
Ungdomskjærlighet, 1915
Familiens yngste, 1917
Alfhild Haug, 1920
Et ægteskaps historie, 1922
Taushet som dræper, 1929
Liv Bille, 1933
Fra Midnatsolens land
Glemte melodier: juleskisser

References

1868 births
1950 deaths
Writers from Bærum
19th-century Norwegian novelists
20th-century Norwegian novelists